The Almighty is the self-titled sixth studio album by Scottish rock band The Almighty. The cover art was designed by "Koot". Floyd London contributed the bass guitar parts on this recording, even though he had left the band some time previously.

Track listing 
All songs written by Ricky Warwick except as indicated
"Broken Machine" (Parsons) – 4:01
"I'm In Love (With Revenge)" – 3:42
"La Chispa de la Muerte" – 3:51
"Big Black Automatic" – 4:00
"For Fuck's Sake" – 4:48
"Poison Eyes" – 3:21
"White Anger Comedown" (Warwick/D. James) – 3:19
"TNT" (Parsons) – 3:09
"Stop" (Parsons) – 2:52
"USAK-47" – 3:30
"Alright" (Warwick/Parsons) – 3:25
"Barfly" (Parsons) – 2:13
"Fat Chance" (Warwick/Parsons) – 2:44

Personnel 
The Almighty
Ricky Warwick – vocals, guitars
Nick Parsons – guitars
Stump Munroe – drums, percussion, vocals

Additional musician
Floyd London – bass guitar, vocals. Former band member but not at the time of this album's recording.

Production
Ronan McHugh and The Almighty – producer
Recorded at Foel Studios, Wales
Mixed at Joe's Garage, Dublin, Ireland
Mastered by Simon Heyworth at Chop 'em Out, London, England

References 

2000 albums
The Almighty (band) albums
Sanctuary Records albums